Eleanor Noble (born June 15, 1980) is a Canadian actress. She is President of the Alliance of Canadian Cinema, Television and Radio Artists (ACTRA).

Career
She voiced Lori Mackney in later episodes of What's with Andy? following Jaclyn Linetsky’s death (2006–2007), and George Lundgren in Arthur. She acted onscreen in the sixth season of the MTV anthology series Undressed, also as Shelley in the episode "Tale of the Dark dragon" as well as a Genie named Belle in the episode "Tale of the Time Trap", on the Nickelodeon show Are You Afraid of the Dark?. She played Angie Burns in Season 4 of The Mystery Files of Shelby Woo. She voiced the character of Maria in the Assassin's Creed. She also voices lcy in RAI English of Winx Club Series and Periwinkle Bellflower in ''The Bellflower Bunnies’'.

In 2021 she was elected President of ACTRA for a two-year term.

Filmography

References

External links
 

Canadian voice actresses
Living people
Canadian video game actresses
1980 births
Anglophone Quebec people 
Arthur (TV series)